Haj Kazem Ab Anbar (Persian: آب انبار حاج کاظم) is an Ab Anbar in Qazvin, Iran. Built in 1840–1841 by Haj Kazem Kuzegar, it is one of the numerous Ab Anbars of the city of Qazvin that were used to store water. There are two windcatchers of eight meters in height attached to it which were used to cool down the water in the reservoir.

It is listed in the list of Iranian national heritage sites with the number 933.

References 

Qazvin
Buildings and structures in Qazvin Province
Historic sites in Iran
Buildings of the Qajar period
National works of Iran